The 2004 Big Ten Conference baseball tournament was held at Siebert Field on the campus of the University of Minnesota in Minneapolis, Minnesota, from May 15 through 19. The top six teams from the regular season participated in the double-elimination tournament, the twenty third annual tournament sponsored by the Big Ten Conference to determine the league champion.  won their eighth tournament championship and earned the Big Ten Conference's automatic bid to the 2004 NCAA Division I baseball tournament.

Format and seeding 
The 2004 tournament was a 6-team double-elimination tournament, with seeds determined by conference regular season winning percentage only. Michigan claimed the third seed over Michigan State by tiebreaker. As in the previous two years, the top two seeds received a single bye, with the four lower seeds playing opening round games. The top seed played the lowest seeded winner from the opening round, with the second seed playing the higher seed. Teams that lost in the opening round played an elimination game.

Tournament

All-Tournament Team 
The following players were named to the All-Tournament Team.

Most Outstanding Player 
Glen Perkins was named Most Outstanding Player. Perkins was a pitcher for Minnesota.

References 

Tournament
Big Ten baseball tournament
Big Ten Baseball Tournament
Big Ten baseball tournament
College baseball tournaments in Minnesota
Baseball competitions in Minneapolis